Wim Arras (born 7 February 1964 in Lier) is a Belgian former cyclist who specialized in sprinting. He won the Paris–Brussels race. His cycling career ended abruptly when he had to retire due to a motorcycle accident in 1990.

References

1964 births
Living people
People from Lier, Belgium
Belgian male cyclists
Cyclists from Antwerp Province